Digitus secundus or second digit can refer to:
 Index finger (digitus secundus manus)
 Second or long toe (digitus secundus pedis)